"Face Down" is a song by the Japanese boy band Arashi. It was released on May 9, 2012, under the record label J Storm as the third single from their eleventh studio album Popcorn (2012). "Face Down" is the theme song of the Japanese television series Kagi no Kakatta Heya, which stars Satoshi Ohno, the member of the group. The single was released in two versions; the regular edition came with the song "Mezashita Mirai e" (目指した未来へ) as B-side and the instrumental versions of both songs, the limited edition accompanied with a DVD including the music video of "Face Down" and the B-side "Hitori Janai sa"(ひとりじゃないさ).

On June 26, 2020, the rearranged version of the song, titled "Face Down: Reborn" was released as a digital download. The production for the version was taken by the multi-platinum selling producers, BloodPop and Tom Norris.

Chart performance
"Face Down" debuted at number one on the Oricon Singles Chart, selling 526,000 copies in its first week, and stayed on the chart for 23 weeks. It was the group's twenty-seventh consecutive, and thirty-fourth overall number-one single in Japan. "Face Down" ranked as the seventh best-selling single of 2012 in Japan, with 619,940 physical copies sold.

Track listing

Charts

Weekly charts

Monthly charts

Year-end charts

Release history

Face Down: Reborn

"Face Down: Reborn" is a rearranged version of "Face Down", produced by American music producers BloodPop and Tom Norris. The version was released digitally on June 26, 2020 as a part of the Reborn Project, with the group performing the rearranged and re-written versions of their hit songs, including their debut single "Arashi" and "Love So Sweet", with new English lyrics as part of them. The song was included in the 2nd. CD of album This Is Arashi limited edition, released November 3, 2020.

Track listing

Charts

Weekly charts

Release history

See also
 List of Oricon number-one singles of 2012

References

2012 singles
2012 songs
Arashi songs
Billboard Japan Hot 100 number-one singles
Oricon Weekly number-one singles
Japanese television drama theme songs
J Storm singles
Songs written by Sho Sakurai
Songs written by Vincent Stein